Mack Maloney (born 1952) is a US writer of speculative fiction, predominantly known for the Starhawk, Wingman, Chopper Ops, and Pirate Hunters fiction series. Maloney received a BS in journalism from Suffolk University and an MA in film at Emerson College. He is the host of Mack Maloney's Military X-Files radio show on iHeartRadio.

Select Bibliography

Starhawk Series
 Starhawk (2001)
 Planet America (2001)
 The Fourth Empire (2002)
 Battle at Zero Point (2003)
 Storm Over Saturn (2004)

Wingman Series
 Wingman (1987)
 The Circle War (1987)
 The Lucifer Crusade (1987)
 Thunder in the East (1988)
 The Twisted Cross (1989)
 The Final Storm (1989)
 Freedom Express (1990)
 Skyfire (1990)
 Return from the Inferno (1991)
 War of the Sun (1992)
 The Ghost War (1993)
 Target: Point Zero (1996)
 Death Orbit (1997)
 The Sky Ghost (1997)
 Return of Sky Ghost (1998)
 The Tomorrow War (1999)
 Attack on Area 51 (2013)
 Battle for America (2017)
 The Odessa Raid (2019)
 Battle of the Wingmen (2020)

Pirate Hunters
 The Pirate Hunters (2010)
 Operation Caribe" (2011)
 Operation Sea Ghost (2015)

Chopper Ops
 Chopper Ops (2011)
 Zero Red (2011)
 Shuttle Down (2011)

Superhawks
 Strike Force Alpha (2015)
 Strike Force Bravo (2015)
 Strike Force Charlie (2015)
 Strike Force Delta (2015)

Starman
 The Kalashnikov Kiss (2019)

Standalone Novels
 War Heaven (1991)
 Thunder Alley (2011)

Nonfiction
 UFOs in Wartime: What They Didn't Want You To Know (2011)
 Beyond Area 51 (2013)
 Haunted Universe'' (2018)

References

External links

Living people
1952 births